Alexander Anthony Keith Bain (born 25 November 2001) is an English actor. He plays Simon Barlow in  Coronation Street, a role he has portrayed since 2008.

Early life
Alex Bain was born in 2001 to Debra and Paul Bain.  He was always into the performing arts, and attended dance, drama and musical theatre lessons from a young age. He attended Walton-le-Dale High School in Preston, Lancashire.After finishing there, he went on to train in Musical Theatre and Dance for 2 years at Shockout Arts in Manchester.

Career
Bain made his first television appearance in an advertisement for Rice Krispies. His first major role was starring in the BBC drama Sunshine, before moving to the role of Simon Barlow in the soap opera Coronation Street, a role which he has played since 2008.

Personal life
In May 2018, it was reported that Alex was due to become a father with his then girlfriend, whom he was in a relationship with from April 2017 to May 2019.  His daughter was born on 2 December 2018. In May 2020, it was reported that Alex has been in a relationship with performer, Mollie, whom he has been with since October 2019, however he first revealed their relationship when he posted a tribute to her on his Instagram in December 2019.   In October 2022 it was announced that the pair have been engaged since October 2021 and only told their parents at Christmastime.

Awards and nominations

References

External links

2001 births
Living people
21st-century English male actors
English male child actors
English male soap opera actors
Male actors from Lancashire
People from Blackburn